Neohermenias melanocopa is a moth of the family Tortricidae. It is found in India, Taiwan, New Guinea, China and Japan.

The wingspan is 14.5–17 mm.

References

Moths described in 1912
Eucosmini
Moths of Japan